During the 2022 Russian invasion of Ukraine, the Russian Armed Forces have launched several missile attacks over the city of Dnipro in Ukraine. These have led to dozens of fatalities and over a hundred injuries among the civilian population.

Strikes in 2022

March 
Dnipro was first hit during the 2022 Russian invasion of Ukraine on 11 March 2022. Three missiles hit the city and killed one person, striking close to an apartment building and a kindergarten. On 15 March, the Dnipro International Airport was heavily damaged by Russian missiles. This destroyed the runaway of the airport. On 30 March, Russian forces struck an oil terminal in Dnipro, destroying it. There were no casualties.

April 
Another attack on the Dnipro airport on 10 April completely destroyed the airport and the infrastructure nearby.

June 
On 28 June, Russian forces fired six 3M-14E Kalibr cruise missiles from the Black Sea to Dnipro at around 5:30 local time. One of them hit an Avtodiesel car repair shop, killing a man and a woman. Other seven people, including a six-year-old boy, were injured. Fragments of the Kalibr missile were found afterwards.

July 
An attack on Dnipro proper was carried out by Russian armed forces on 15 July 2022. As a result, four people died, 16 were injured. The main target was the largest space plant of Ukraine located within the city.

The city was shelled from Tu-95 aircraft from the northern part of the Caspian Sea with X-101 missiles. According to preliminary data, a total of 8 rockets were fired. Four missiles were shot down by the Ukrainian Air Defence Forces. Each missile costs 13 million dollars (8 missiles cost Russia more than 100 million dollars).

Part of the rockets hit the "Pivdenmash" enterprise. As a result of the impact, the city's water supply was damaged, and part of the city's residents were left without water supply. More than ten cars were damaged, doors and windows were destroyed in residential buildings.

Four people were killed. One of the victims is a city bus driver. On the first day, 15 wounded were reported, and the next day their number increased to 16.

September 
On the morning of 29 September 2022 missiles hit residential areas in Dnipro, and three people were killed. The central bus station was also hit.

October 

Dnipro was also hit during the 10 October 2022 Russian missile strikes on critical infrastructure. It was hit by at least five missiles. During the attack that took place during morning rush hour three civilians were killed. 

On 18 October 2022 Russian missile strikes targeted the energy infrastructure of Dnipro. One man was injured and a large-scale fire broke out at an energy infrastructure facility that was severely damaged. Also more than three dozen residential buildings were damaged, including schools and kindergartens.

On 25 October 2022 two people were killed, including a pregnant woman, and four injured due to a fire at a petrol station in Dnipro after fragments of a Russian missile had hit it.

November 

In the early hours of 9 November 2022 Russian forces deployed kamikaze drones in an attack hitting a logistics business and causing a large fire. Four employees sustained injuries, three severe. Anti-aircraft defence systems (reportedly) destroyed five loitering munitions.

Around 08:30 in the morning of 15 November, while people where commuting to work, Dnipro was hit by a strike on (according to Prime Minister Denys Shmyhal) the PA Pivdenmash missile plant. Governor of Dnipropetrovsk Oblast  Valentyn Reznichenko stated that an industrial company, houses, trolleybuses and a "lively street" were damaged. Reznichenko claimed that 23 people were injured, including a teenager. Dnipro mayor Borys Filatov claimed a city hall employee was wounded in the attack while out helping elderly women.

On 26 November 2022, around noon, a Russian missile strike on Dnipro injured 13 people and partially destroyed seven private houses in Dnipro's Amur-Nyzhnodniprovskyi District. Dnipro mayor Borys Filatov reported that city communications and infrastructure were not damaged. Governor Valentyn Reznichenko stated that due to the attack one woman was hospitalised in critical condition. The following day Reznichenko reported that a man was found dead under the rubble.

A Russian nightly multiple missile strike destroyed an enterprise 29 November 2022. No (human) casualties were reported.

Strikes in 2023

January 

On 14 January a multi-storey residential building in Dnipro was hit by a Russian attack. The explosion was heard at approximately 3:41 p.m. A local air alert had begun at 2:00 p.m. On 19 January, 46 people are known to be killed and 80 to be injured. 11 people remain missing. 39 people were rescued.

March 
On 9 March Dnipro was also hit during during a nationwide Russian missile strike. According to the Dnipro City Council dozens of buildings were damaged by blast waves and in more than 120 apartments windows were broken. Fragments of a rocket were scattered almost all over the terrain of yacht club Sich. No casualties were reported.

References

External links

March 2022 events in Ukraine
April 2022 events in Ukraine
June 2022 events in Ukraine
July 2022 events in Ukraine
September 2022 events in Ukraine
October 2022 events in Ukraine
November 2022 events in Ukraine
January 2023 events in Ukraine
Airstrikes during the 2022 Russian invasion of Ukraine
Attacks on buildings and structures in Ukraine
History of Dnipro
War crimes during the 2022 Russian invasion of Ukraine
Airstrikes conducted by Russia